Solita is a technology, data and design company established in Finland. In 2021, Solita had over 1,100 employees in six countries: Finland, Sweden, Estonia, Germany, Denmark and Belgium. Solita is participating in national projects in Finland such as Koronavilkku, a mobile application to track exposure to COVID-19. The company develops IT services, e-services and knowledge management solutions for companies and public administration organisations. It offers for example, strategic consulting, service design, digital, AI and analytics services, as well as cloud services.

History 
Heikki Halme established Solita in 1996. The company started out as a software developer for Nokia which remained its only customer during the first five years. Halme was elected as Finnish Software Entrepreneur of the Year 2010. At the time he was the main owner and the chair of the board. In 2008 Jari Niska followed Halme as a new CEO. Tivi magazine placed Niska on the list of top 100 Finnish IT influencers in, for example, in 2013, and 2015 and 2019.

In March 2013 Vaaka Partners bought 75 percent of the company whose products were related to digital business, information management and e-services. Solita got the seventh place in the Best Places to Work competition arranged by the Great Place to Work Institute Finland while in 2014 and 2015 it ranked sixth. In October 2014, Solita set up an office in Oulu. In March 2015, Solita established a new business unit, Solita Design, which focused on for example in service design and user experience design. Within a year the company's personnel grew by 26 percents while its turnover grew by over one third to 49.7 million euros.

In 2017, Solita started offices in Sweden and Estonia. In February, Solita, with over 500 employees at the time, announced its intention to get listed. In the spring, it acquired Palmu, a service design company doing business in Singapore and Finland. Solita hired an in-house coach to coach the employees with their work as well as their private life which was not common in Finland.

In April 2018, Apax Digital Fund, a global private equity firm, announced the acquisition of a majority stake in Solita from Vaaka Partners. Solita had 650 employees. After the acquisition a share issue for Solita employees was arranged and over 300 of them participated. In May, Solita established a new unit, Solita Health, focusing on the health and well-being sector and started maintaining an IoT ecosystem, whose participants included AWS, IBM, Azure, Tableau and Wazombi Labs. The system had services used for testing, AI applications, data logging, analytics, visualisation and cloud solutions. In September, Solita informed that it had abandoned its plan to get listed. It had employees in Helsinki, Tampere, Oulu, Stockholm, Tallinn, Turku and Lahti. In October Solita obtained Machine Learning Competency status from Amazon Web Services (AWS) for machine learning solutions and expertise.

In 2019, Solita acquired two Swedish companies, Sparks AB and Ferrologic, a digital services consultancy. Ferrologic empoloyed about 100 persons in Sweden, Denmark and Belgium. The mergers increased the number of Solita employees to approximately 1,000 people.

In 2020 Solita's operations were grouped into three business areas: Finland, Sweden, and other international markets while its business units were focusing on development, cloud & connectivity, design & strategy and data. In June Solita won a competition for a mobile application to track exposure to COVID-19 arranged by the Finnish Institute for Health and Welfare with the aim of combating the COVID-19 pandemic  in Finland. The application, called Koronavilkku, was published on 31 August 2020. During the first 24 hours, the application was downloaded one million times, and over 2 million times during the first two weeks. For Kone it created a cloud based analysing system collecting data from its elevators with the aim to prevent their hardware failures. In October Finnish State Development Company Vake, Yleisradio and University of Helsinki started collecting 10,000 hours of speech in Finnish to develop AI voice recognition. The collection technology was planned and created by Solita.

In 2021, CEO Jari Niska was followed by Ossi Lindroos. Operations were managed by Timo Honko in Finland and by Johan Thyblad in Sweden. Solita employed over 1,100 people in Finland, Gothenburg and Stockholm in Sweden, Copenhagen in Denmark, Tallinn in Estonia, Berlin and Munich in Germany and Leuven in Belgium. Approximately 450 employees are part owners of Solita. The company headquarters are in Tampere and it has Finnish offices also in Helsinki, Lahti, Oulu and Turku.

In April 2022, Solita acquired the Danish IT consultancy Commentor A/S, which employed more than 145 people.

References

External links 
 website
Software companies of Finland
Companies based in Tampere